The 2012 Halton Borough Council election was held on 3 May 2012 to elect members of Halton Borough Council in England.

References

2012 English local elections
2012
2010s in Cheshire